Thiomargarita magnifica is a species of sulfur-oxidizing gammaproteobacteria, found growing underwater on the detached leaves of red mangroves from the Guadeloupe archipelago in the Lesser Antilles. This filament-shaped bacteria is the largest known bacterium, with an average length of 10 mm and some individuals reaching , making the bacteria visible to the naked eye. The bacterium was described in a preprint submitted in February 2022. The bacterium was originally discovered in the early 2010s by Olivier Gros from the University of the French Antilles at Pointe-à-Pitre, but initially it did not attract much attention as Gros thought his find to be a fungus; it took Gros and other researchers five years to determine that it is a bacterium, and a few more years until Jean-Marie Volland, a graduate student working under the supervision of Gros, figured out its unusual properties.

Thiomargarita means "sulfur pearl" in Latin. This refers to the appearance of the cells; they contain microscopic sulfur granules that scatter incident light, lending the cell a pearly lustre. The name magnifica means "magnificent" and was chosen by researcher Silvina González Rizzo, who identified T. magnifica as a bacterium.

Structure
Metabolism in bacteria can only occur through the diffusion of molecules of both nutrients and waste through the interior of the bacterial cells, and this places an upper limit on the size of these organisms. The large sulfur bacterium T. namibiensis, discovered in 1999, overcomes this limit by including a large sac filled with water and nitrates. This sac pushes the cell contents to the cell wall, so that the diffusion can work; life processes occur only "along the edge" of the cell. T. magnificas cell includes a similar vacuole that occupies most of the cell (65–80% by volume) and pushes the cytoplasm to the periphery of the cell (the thickness of cytoplasm varies from 1.8 to 4.8 microns).

The size of this bacterium and its extreme polyploidity are partially explained by its genome, which lacks many common bacterial cell division genes.

The outside of the cell lacks epibiotic bacteria; their "surprising absence" can be explained by T. magnifica possibly producing biologically active or even antibiotic chemical compounds.

Encapsulated DNA
Another sac or compartment within the organism contains its DNA. Researchers have named these compartments "pepins". This structure is very different from the free-floating DNA found in most other bacteria. This arrangement is important, in as much as it blurs the boundary between prokaryotes, primitive single-cell organisms that do not have a cell nucleus (their DNA is left in the cytoplasm), and eukaryotes, where the DNA is surrounded by the nuclear envelope. With T. magnifica being a bacterium, it belongs to prokaryotes, but its cell includes membrane sacs that encapsulate the cell's DNA.

References

	

Thiotrichales
Bacteria described in 2022
Gram-negative bacteria